Ak is a minor Sepik language spoken in Sandaun Province, Papua New Guinea. It is spoken in Kwieftim village.

References

External links
 

Yellow River languages
Languages of Sandaun Province
Severely endangered languages